Alexandre Baréty (1844-1918) was a French physician. He was the author of many medical papers. With Henri Sappia, he co-founded the Acadèmia Nissarda, a historical society in Nice, in 1904.

Works

References

1844 births
1918 deaths
People from Nice
19th-century French physicians
French medical writers